Agent for H.A.R.M. is a 1966 science fiction spy thriller directed by Gerd Oswald and starring Mark Richman, one of a number of spy thrillers of the era having conspicuous sci-fi elements. Here it is the deadly spores which turn human flesh into fungus on contact.

The film was intended to be the television pilot for a new spy series. However, it was later decided that it should be given a theatrical release instead. It was released as a double feature with Wild Wild Winter.

Plot
Adam Chance (Peter Mark Richman), works for an American agency, H.A.R.M. (Human Aetiological Relations Machine). He is assigned to protect Dr. Jan Steffanic (Carl Esmond), a recent Soviet defector who has developed a new weapon which fires spores that upon contact with skin slowly eat the body away.

Following Dr Steffanic's arrival in the US he is taken into protective custody by H.A.R.M. and is placed in a beach house along with his niece and Agent Chance to develop a spore antidote. Here he reveals the communists' real plan, which is to dust all of the American crops with these deadly spores. During their time at this house Chance falls for Steffanic's niece Ava Vestok (Barbara Bouchet), who is later revealed to be a communist spy. After the flat is attacked, Dr Steffanic is kidnapped by European spies and taken to a warehouse. Chance eventually rides in and a gun fight ensues in which Steffanic is exposed to the deadly spores in a valiant sacrifice, and dies. Afterwards, Chance re-appears at the beach house and arrests Ava for good.

Cast

 Mark Richman as Adam Chance
 Carl Esmond as Professor Janos Steffanic
 Barbara Bouchet as Ava Vestok
 Martin Kosleck as Basil Malko
 Wendell Corey as Jim Graff
 Robert Quarry as Borg
 Rafael Campos as Luis
 Aliza Gur as Mid-Eastern contact
 Donna Michelle as Marian
 Marc Snegoff as Conrad
 Chris Anders as Schloss
 Steve Stevens as Billy
 Horst Ebersberg as Helgar
 Ray Dannis as Henry Manson
 Robert Donner as Morgue attendant

Music
 On The Damned's 1980 LP, The Black Album, Adam Chance is mentioned alongside Zorro and Corporal Clott in the song The History Of The World, Part 1, which was also released as a single.
 In 2009, there was a song of the same name written about the film by punk rock band, The Riverdales

Reception
The New York Times called it an "anemic James Bond imitation".

Trivia
This film was featured on Mystery Science Theater 3000.

See also
List of American films of 1966

References

External links
 
 
 MST3K Episode Guide: Agent for H.A.R.M.

1966 films
1960s science fiction thriller films
1960s spy thriller films
American science fiction thriller films
American spy thriller films
Cold War spy films
1960s English-language films
Fictional secret agents and spies
Films set in California
Universal Pictures films
Films directed by Gerd Oswald
Films shot in California
Parody films based on James Bond films
1960s American films